Adriana Hölszky (born 30 June 1953) is a Romanian-born German music educator, composer and pianist who has been living in Germany since 1976.

Biography 
Hölszky was born in Bucharest. In the years 1959-1969 she studied piano with Olga Rosca-Berdan at the music school in Bucharest. In 1972, she began to study composition with Ştefan Niculescu as parallel to piano studies at the Bucharest Music Conservatory. In 1976 she moved with her family to Germany. Here she continued her studies, and in 1977-1980 she studied composition at the Musikhochschule in Stuttgart with Milko Kelemen, and chamber music with Günter Louegk. During her studies she performed as a pianist of the Trio Lipatti, together with her twin sister, violinist Monika Hölszky-Wiedemann and cellist Hertha Rosa-Herseni.

In 1977 and 1978, she participated in the International Mozarteum Summer Academy, and in 1978-1984 regularly in the Darmstadt Summer Courses for New Music. In 1980 she received a teaching position at the State University of Music and Performing Arts Stuttgart, and in 1983 a grant from the Arts Foundation of Baden-Württemberg. In 1986 she took first place at the Composers' Forum of the Darmstadt Summer Courses for New Music. In 1987 she received a scholarship from the Ministry of Culture of Lower Saxony. In 1992 she took composition seminars in Tokyo and Kyoto, and at the IRCAM in Paris. Her increasing international popularity was shown by three concerts she performed in Athens, Thessaloniki and Boston in 1993.

Between 1997 and 2000, Hölszky was professor of composition at the Rostock University of Music and Theatre, and since 2000 she has been professor of composition at the Mozarteum University of Salzburg. Since 2002 she has been a member of the Academy of Fine Arts in Berlin.

Awards

1978 Prize of the International Chamber Music Competition in Florence
1979 1st Prize of the Valentino Bucchi Composition Competition in Rome
1980 Prize of the International Chamber Music Competition in Colmar France)
1981 Gaudeamus Prize, Bilthoven (Netherlands)
1982 Max Deutsch Paris Prize, Prize of the City of Stuttgart, Composition Prize of the East German Cultural Foundation
1985 1st Prize EnsembliaComposition Competition, Monchengladbach
1985 Johann Wenzel Stamitz Prize, Mannheim GEDOK Price
1988 Prize of the City of Stuttgart
1989 1st Prize at GEDOK International Composition Competition
1990 Artist Award Heidelberg and Mainz Schneider-Schott Music Prize
1991 Rome Prize of the Villa Massimo
2003 Bach Prize of the Free and Hanseatic City of Hamburg

Works

Stage works

Other works
Piano Sonata, 1975
String Quartet, 1975
Constellation for orchestra, 1975–76
Monologue for female voice and drums, 1977
... There were black birds for five female voices and percussion, 1978
Il était un homme rouge for 12 voices, 1978
Comment for Lauren for soprano, 8 brass and timpani, 1978
Space for four orchestral groups, 1979–80
Omnion for tape, 1980
Questions I, for soprano, baritone, violin, cello and piano, 1980
Questions II for soprano, baritone, violin, cello, flute, piccolo, guitar and piano, 1981
Flux re-flux for alto saxophone, 1981–83
Inner Worlds I for String Trio, 1981
Inner Worlds II for String Quartet, 1981–82
Arcades for two flutes and string quartet, 1982
Inlay I for flute, violin and piano, 1982
Decorum for harpsichord, 1982–83
Inlay II for flute, violin, harpsichord and piano, 1982–83
Inlay III for flute, violin, two pianos, 1982–83
Controversia for two flutes, two oboes and violin, 1983
Erewhon for 14 instruments, 1984
Sound projector for 12 strings, 1984–85
New Erewhon for ensemble, 1984–85/90
Props for nine instruments, 1985
... And again darkness I für Pauken and piano, 1985/90
... And again darkness II for timpani and organ, 1986
Always silent for four choruses, 1986
Hörfenster for Franz Liszt for piano, 1986–87
Fragments from 'Bremer Freiheit' for accordion, and drums cymbalon, 1988
Suspension bridges - String Quartet 'to Schubert', two string quartets, octets may be played simultaneously, 1989–90
Hunting wolves back for six timpani, 1989–90
Caravan - reflection on the sound of walking for 12 timpani, 1989–90
Flutes of the light, 'game face' for female voice, five horns and other instruments ad lib., 1989–90
Message (E. Ionesco), for mezzo-soprano, baritone, narrator and electronics, 1990
Light Aircraft for violin, flute and orchestra, 1990
Segments I (for seven centers of sound) for piccolo flute, euphonium, double bass, piano, cymbalom, accordion and percussion, 1991–92
Segments II for piano and percussion, 1992
Segments III for oboe, double bass and accordion, 1992
Miserere for accordion, 1992
A honeycomb sound for violin, 1993
World ends for 4 Brass, 1993
A due - wave study for 2 clarinets, 1993
Painting of a slain (JMR Lenz) for 72 voices, 1993
On the night for the orchestra, 1994/2001
Cargo for Orchestra, 1995
Arena for Orchestra, 1995
Qui audit me for alto flute, viola, guitar and speaker (ad lib.), 1996
Clouds and moon for accordion and cello, 1996/2006
Avance Impulsion mécaniques for clarinet, euphonium, cello and piano, 1997
And I looked like a sea of glass mixed with fire ... for organ, 1997
Spin 2 for violin and keyboard, 1998
High Way for accordion and 19 Instruments, 1998–99
Gamut of myths, for six percussionists, string orchestra, 1999
High Way for accordion and ensemble, 1999/2003
On the other side for 3 soloists and orchestra, 2000
High Way for One for Accordion, 2000
Dream song for percussion, 2000
Mask and color for baritone (mezzo-soprano) and piano, 2000, text: Michael Krüger
Umsphinxt ... A puzzle for birds of prey, text by Friedrich Nietzsche's "The desert grows' for 48stg choir, 2000–01
On the other side for clarinet, harp, accordion and orchestra, 2000–03
On behalf of all the light '(second part) for choir and organ, 2004
Lemurs and ghosts for soprano, flute, clarinet, violin, cello and piano, 2004–05
Like a bird Hommage à György Kurtág for Violin, 2006
Maneuvers for two clarinets and orchestra, 2006
Demons for chorus and orchestra, 2006
Snowbirds (like a bird II) Hommage à György Kurtág for violin and piano, 2006
Countdown for Counter Tenor and Orchestra, 2007. Text: Ver du Bois
Grid for bassoon, 2008
The dogs of Orion for 8 voices, 2010
Apeiron for violin and string orchestra, 2018

Prominent students

References

Further reading 
 Metamorphose und Eruption : ǂb Annäherung an die Klangwelten Adriana Hölszkys / ǂc Maria Kostakeva. .
 Eva-Maria Houben: gelb. Neues Hören. Vinko Globokar, Hans-Joachim Hespos, Adriana Hölszky. Saarbrücken 1996, .
 Jean-Noel von der Weid: Die Musik des 20. Jahrhunderts. Frankfurt am Main & Leipzig 2001, S. 472. 
 Beatrix Borchard (ed.) Adriana Hölszky, Klangportraits Band 1, furore-Verlag.
 Wolfgang Gratzer/Jörn Peter Hiekel (ed.): Ankommen:gehen. Adriana Hölszkys Textkompositionen. edition neue zeitschrift für musik, ed. Rolf W. Stoll, Mainz 2007

External links

 Biography
 Biography of Hölszky on the website of the Association Contemporary Opera, Berlin
 Profile of Hölszky's compositions in a private online music magazine.

1953 births
Living people
Musicians from Bucharest
Romanian emigrants to Germany
German opera composers
German music educators
Women classical composers
Members of the Academy of Arts, Berlin
Academic staff of the State University of Music and Performing Arts Stuttgart
Academic staff of Mozarteum University Salzburg
Women opera composers
Women music educators